Arblade-le-Haut is a commune in the Gers department in southwestern France.

Geography 
Arblade-le-Haut is located in the canton of Grand-Bas-Armagnac and in the arrondissement of Condom.

Population

See also
Communes of the Gers department

References

Communes of Gers